The New Zealand Racing Hall of Fame recognises and honours those whose achievements have enriched the New Zealand thoroughbred horse racing industry.

History

The Hall of Fame's first group of honorees were inducted in 2006, and inductions are held every other year. The inaugural chairman was Gerald Fell.

Due to COVID-19, the 2020 Induction dinner scheduled for 3 May 2020 was postponed. At that stage, three inductees had been announced: Mufhasa, James McDonald and Sir Peter Vela. The dinner was held on 2 May 2021 and nine new inductees were welcomed.

Horses

People

See also
 Thoroughbred racing in New Zealand
 New Zealand Horse of the Year
 Australian Racing Hall of Fame
 Canadian Horse Racing Hall of Fame
 United States' National Museum of Racing and Hall of Fame

References

External links
 

Horse racing in New Zealand
Horse racing museums and halls of fame
Awards established in 2006
New Zealand sports trophies and awards
Racing
2006 establishments in New Zealand